Maria Geznenge (née Gusheva; born 13 March 1977) is a retired Bulgarian tennis player.

In her career, she won one singles title and two doubles titles on the ITF Circuit. On 9 September 2002, she reached her best singles ranking of world No. 190. On 15 September 2003, she peaked at No. 163 in the doubles rankings.

Playing for Bulgaria at the Fed Cup, Geznenge has a win–loss record of 5–2.

Geznenge retired from professional tennis 2006.

ITF Circuit finals

Singles: 4 (1 title, 3 runner–ups)

Doubles: 10 (2 titles, 8 runner–ups)

References

External links
 
 
 

1977 births
Living people
Bulgarian female tennis players
Sportspeople from Sofia